Daniel Fister is an American politician from Kentucky. He is a Republican and represents District 56 in the State House.

References 

Living people
Republican Party members of the Kentucky House of Representatives
21st-century American politicians
Year of birth missing (living people)